Raymond Theodore Miner (April 4, 1897 – September 15, 1963) was an American Major League Baseball pitcher. He played for the Philadelphia Athletics during the  season.

References

Major League Baseball pitchers
Philadelphia Athletics players
Baseball players from New York (state)
1897 births
1963 deaths